Oedipina stenopodia is a species of salamander in the family Plethodontidae.
It is endemic to Guatemala.

Its natural habitats are subtropical or tropical moist montane forests, plantations, and rural gardens.

References

Endemic fauna of Guatemala
Oedipina
Amphibians of Guatemala
Taxonomy articles created by Polbot
Amphibians described in 1993